Justicia serrana is a plant native to the Cerrado vegetation of Brazil.

See also
 List of plants of Cerrado vegetation of Brazil

References

serrana
Flora of Brazil